The Samsung Galaxy Tab 4 7.0 is a 7-inch Android-based tablet computer produced and marketed by Samsung Electronics. It belongs to the fourth generation of the Samsung Galaxy Tab series, which also includes an 8-inch and a 10.1-inch model, the Galaxy Tab 4 8.0 and Galaxy Tab 4 10.1. It was announced on 1 April 2014 and was released on 1 May.

History 
The Galaxy Tab 4 7.0 was announced on 1 April 2014. It was shown along with the Galaxy Tab 4 8.0 and Galaxy Tab 4 10.1 ahead of the 2014 Mobile World Conference.

Features
The Galaxy Tab 4 7.0 is released with Android 4.4.2 KitKat. Samsung has customized the interface with its TouchWiz UX software. As well as apps from Google, including Google Play, Gmail and YouTube, it has access to Samsung apps such as S Suggest, S Voice, S Planner, WatchON, Smart Stay, Multi-Window, Group Play, and All Share Play.

The Galaxy Tab 4 7.0 is available in WiFi-only, 3G & Wi-Fi, and 4G/LTE & WiFi variants. Storage ranges from 8, 16, or 32 GB depending on the model number, with a microSDXC card slot for expansion. It has a 7-inch WXGA TFT screen with a resolution of 1280x800 pixels (216ppi). It also features a 1.3 MP front camera and 3.2 MP rear-facing camera without autofocus/flash. It also has the ability to record HD videos.

USB OTG is only supported by the LTE version of the Samsung Galaxy Tab 4 7.0.

Special editions
On 5 June 2014, it was announced jointly by both Samsung and Barnes & Noble that this tablet would be the foundation for the next Nook tablet. It is called the Samsung Galaxy Tab 4 Nook; it was launched and released for $199 on 21 August 2014.

See also
 Samsung Galaxy Tab series
 Samsung Electronics
 Samsung Galaxy Tab 4 8.0
 Samsung Galaxy Tab 4 10.1

References

Samsung Galaxy Tab series
Android (operating system) devices
Tablet computers introduced in 2014
Tablet computers